The Eurasian baskettail (Epitheca bimaculata) is a species of dragonfly. It was described by Toussaint de Charpentier in 1825 and initially placed in the genus Libellula. It is the type species of the genus Epitheca.

Distribution
Its habitat ranges from Western France to Japan and eastern Siberia.

It has been found in Western Europe, but here it is "rare and seen very irregularly". It has also been found in Serbia, and Kaliningrad Oblast, Russia. Its occurrence in Hungary is "sporadic". It also is found in Ukraine.

Biology
It flies in May and June.

Former subspecies
Two subspecies were recognized, but they were synonymized in 2004:

 E. b. sibirica 
 E. b. altaica

References

Further reading

 
 

Taxa named by Toussaint de Charpentier
Insects described in 1825
Dragonflies of Europe
Insects of Russia